Merle is a given name used by both men and women, from the French word merle meaning blackbird (from the Latin merula).. Related names  are Merrill or Muriel.

People

Female
Merle Barwis (1900–2014), American-Canadian supercentenarian
Merle van Benthem (born 1992), Dutch cyclist
Merle Chambers (born 1946), American business executive
Merle Collins (born 1950), Grenadian poet and writer
Merle Dandridge (born 1975), American actress and singer 
Merle Egan Anderson (c. 1888–1984), American military servicewoman
Merle Feld (1947), American author, playwright, poet and activist 
Merle S. Goldberg (1936–1998), American journalist and an abortion rights activist
Merle Goldman (born 1931), American historian
Merle Greene Robertson (1913–2011), American artist, art historian and archaeologist 
Merle Hodge (born 1944), Trinidadian novelist
Merle Hoffman (born 1946), American journalist and activist
Merle Jääger (born 1965), Estonian actress and poet
Merle Karusoo (born 1944), Estonian stage director and writer
Merle Keagle (1923–1960), American baseball player
Merle G. Kearns (1938–2014), American politician
Merle Kivimets (born 1974), Estonian track and field athlete
Merle Krigul (born 1954), Estonian philologist and politician
Merle Louise (born 1934), American Broadway actress
Merle Oberon (1911–1979), Indo-English actress
Merle Palmiste (born 1970), Estonian actress
Merle Park (born 1937), British prima ballerina
Merle Richardson (born 1930), Australian lawn bowls player
Merle Soppela (born 1991), Finnish alpine ski racer
Merle Talvik (born 1954), Estonian actress
Merle Temkin (born 1937), American artist
Merle Tottenham (1901–1958), English film actress
Merle Viirmaa (born 1974), Estonian biathlete 
Merle Woo (born 1941), American academic and activist

Male
Merle Allin (born 1953), American punk rock musician
Merle Anthony (1926–1993), American baseball umpire
Merle Battiste (1933–2009), American chemist
Merle Bettenhausen (born 1943), American race car driver
Merle Boucher (born 1946), American politician
Merle Boyer (1920–2009), American jewelry designer
Merle Curti (1897–1997), American historian and Pulitzer Prize winner
Merle Dickerson (1911/12–1984), Canadian politician
Merle Evans (1891–1987), American cornet player and circus bandleader
Merle Fainsod (1907–1972), American political scientist
Merle Flowers (born 1968), American politician
Merle Gulick (1906–1976), American football player
Merle Haggard (1937–2016), American country-western musician
Merle Hansen (1919–2009), American farm activist
Merle Harmon (1926–2009), American sportscaster
Merle Hay (1896–1917), American Army soldier, first U.S. soldier to be killed in WWI 
Merle J. Isaac (1898–1996), American composer 
Merle Kilgore (1934–2005), American singer, songwriter and manager
Merle Lawrence (1915–2007), American physiologist
Merle Randall (1888–1950), American physical chemist
Merle Robbins (c. 1912–1984), businessman, inventor of the card game UNO
Merle Sande (1939–2007), American physician
Merle Schlosser (born 1926), American football player and coach
Merle Settlemire (1903–1988), American baseball player
Merle Shain (1935–1989), Canadian author and journalist
Merle Taylor (1927–1987), American bluegrass musician
Merle Travis (1917–1983), American country music singer
Merle Tuve (1901–1982), American geophysicist
Merle Watson (1945–1985), American folk musician
Merle Leland Youngs (1886–1958), American businessman

Fictional characters
Merle Dixon, in AMC's TV series The Walking Dead
Merle, a character in The Vision of Escaflowne, a 1996 anime series
Merle Hitower Highchurch, in the Maximum Fun podcast The Adventure Zone
Merle Johnson, in The Godfather Part II
Merle Tucker, father of Cameron Tucker in Modern Family

References

Estonian feminine given names
English feminine given names
English masculine given names
English unisex given names
Given names derived from birds